Black Duck Creek is a rural locality in the Lockyer Valley Region, Queensland, Australia.

Geography 
Black Duck Creek is a rural area in a north–south valley formed by the creek of the same name.

The locality has the following mountains:

 Cattle Station Peak 
 Mount Hennessy 
 Mount Machar 
 Point Townson

History 
In 1922, the school buildings were moved to neighbouring Junction View, ready for re-opening as Junction View State School from 18 August 1922. The Black Duck Creek State School site was sold by the Queensland Government in 1985. Junction View State State School was mothballed on 31 December 2008 and closed on 31 December 2010.

Education 
There are no schools in Black Duck Creek. The nearest government primary school is Mount Sylvia State School in Mount Sylvia to the north. The nearest government secondary school is Lockyer District State High School in Gatton to the north-east.

References 

Lockyer Valley Region
Localities in Queensland